Jetisu district is a district of Almaty, Kazakhstan.

References 

 
Districts of Kazakhstan

Districts of Almaty